Christopher Wray Lighting works is a grade II-listed building in the east side of Birmingham city centre, England. The works consist of a complex of buildings fronted by a row of three townhouses, left vacant since 2003.

Parts of the building complex date back to the eighteenth century when they were built as terraced houses in the Georgian period.

References

External links 

 

Grade II listed buildings in Birmingham